WBTL may refer to:

 WBTL (AM), a radio station (1540 AM) licensed to serve Richmond, Virginia, United States
 WULT, a radio station (1450 AM) licensed to serve Highland Springs, Virginia, which held the call sign WBTL in 2018
 WLEE (AM), a radio station (1570 AM) licensed to serve Winona, Mississippi, United States, which held the call sign WBTL from 1958 to 2016
 WBTL-LP, a defunct low-power television station (channel 34) formerly licensed to serve Toledo, Ohio, United States